Kampong Pintu Malim is a village in Brunei-Muara District, Brunei. It is also a neighbourhood in the country's capital Bandar Seri Begawan. The population was 319 in 2016. It is one of the villages within Mukim Kota Batu. The postcode is BD1317.

Facilities 
Pintu Malim Primary School is the village's government primary school. It also shares grounds with Pintu Malim Religious School, the village's government school for the country's Islamic religious primary education.

The village mosque is Kampong Pintu Malim Mosque; the construction began in 1995 and completed in 1997. It can accommodate 1,000 worshippers.

References 

Villages in Brunei-Muara District
Neighbourhoods in Bandar Seri Begawan